Andreas Papaemmanouil (18 February 1939 – 1 March 2020) was a Greek professional footballer who played as a forward and a later manager.

Early life
Papaemmanouil was born on 18 February 1939 in Neo Faliro. The proximity of the family's house to the Karaiskakis stadium made it easy for the Olympiacos people to notice Papaemmanouil on the streets of the neighborhood. In 1952, at the age of 14, he played in the first team of Peiraikos and after 3 years at the age of 17, his name began to be heavily discussed in Piraeus, while the club's friendly relations with Olympiacos leave no doubt about his immediate move to the red and whites. Even though Andreas Mouratis had spoken flatteringly of him and his father's employer, the weaver Kostas Velissaropoulos, was pressuring him to take Papaemmanouil to Olympiacos, the visit to the family home of agents of Panathinaikos Asprogerakas and Matzevelakis played a catalytic role as a consequence in 1958 Papaemmanouil signed to the greens receiving 7,000 drachmas while 100,000 drachmas went to Peiraikos.

Club career
In 1959, Papaemmanouil won the Athens' league, competing in the last match of Panathinaikos in the competition, while at the end of the season the won the first championship under a national division. The following season, under Harry Game he developed his attacking abilities as he placed Papaemmanouil in the center of the attack and the results were impressive, as he scored 23 goals in 28 appearances, becoming the top scorer of his team and led them to win the title again. On 24 July 1960 he scored a hat-trick against Olympiacos in a 4–1 home win and he is the only Panathinaikos player to score a hat-trick in a derby of the eternal enemies. His main characteristics were his incredible speed, his dynamic moves and his very powerful shot. Under Stjepan Bobek, relocated him as a left midfielder, forming an amazing triple alongside Takis Loukanidis and Mimis Domazos they won the championship in 1964 undefeated. With the greens, he won two more championships, in 1965 and 1969. In 1969 his contract was terminated after a interference of the regime in administration. At Panathinaikos he won 6 Championships and 2 Greek Cups.

After a short period of isolation and individual training, Papaemmanouil played with Australian club Canterbury for six months. He returned to Greece and signed for Ikaros Nea Ionia, but with the intervention of Kleanthis Maropoulos at the then General Manager, Aslanidis, the sport's card was canceled and he signed for AEK Athens for 100,000 drachmas.

At AEK, Papaemmanouil with Mimis Papaioannou and Kostas Nikolaidis formed an amazing attacking triplet that won them the Championship of the season 1971. He achieved a scoring record on 13 September 1970 in a Cup match against the lower-tier club Kipoupoli when he scored 7 of AEK's 20 total goals. He left AEK in 1972 ending his playing career.

Papaemmanouil was selected amongst the greatest Greek football players for the decade of the 1960's from gazzetta.gr.

International career
Papaemmanouil made 16 appearances and scored six goals for Greece from 1959 to 1965. He made his debut in a 1–1 draw against France, on 12 March 1959 for the 1960 European championship qualifiers.

Managerial career
After his playing day were over, Papaemmanoul followed a coaching career. He started in the Anagennisi Arta, where he remained for 6 years. This was followed by Kerkyra, Tunisiakos, Kallithea and Fostiras. In 1980, he spent 6 months at the bench of Panathinaikos, recording to his credit the 4–2 victory over Juventus at home. He also coached the greens briefly in 1983. From 1992 to 2002 he was the coach of the national team's youth divisions.

Personal life
Papaemmanouil was the 9th child of a family in which there were 10 siblings, 7 girls and three boys, all three of whom became footballers. The eldest brother of his family, Petros played in small teams and stopped early due to health problems, while the third, Giorgos, also played a year in Olympiacos. Since the beginning of 2020, he faced serious health problems, as a result of which he died on March 1, 2020, in the hospital of Marousi.

Honours

Panathinaikos
Alpha Ethniki: 1959–60, 1960–61, 1961–62, 1963–64, 1964–65, 1968–69
Greek Cup: 1966–67, 1968–69
Athens FCA League: 1958–59

AEK Athens
Alpha Ethniki: 1970–71

Individual
Greek Cup top scorer: 1970–71

References

External links

1939 births
2020 deaths
Greek footballers
Greece international footballers
Panathinaikos F.C. players
AEK Athens F.C. players
Super League Greece players
Panathinaikos F.C. managers
Association football forwards
Greek football managers
Footballers from Piraeus